The Beerschot Tennis Club, now known as the Royal Beerschot Tennis and Hockey Club is a field hockey and tennis club founded in 1899 in Kontich, Belgium, located in neighboring Antwerp. It hosted the tennis events for the 1920 Summer Olympics.

Honours

Men
Men's Belgian Hockey League: 6
1925, 1927, 1932, 1934, 1942, 1944

Women
Belgian national title: 5
1942–43, 1943–44, 1945–46, 1946–47, 1951–52

Men's squad

References
Sports-reference.com profile of Tennis at the 1920 Summer Olympics.

References

External links
Official website

 
1899 establishments in Belgium
Venues of the 1920 Summer Olympics
Olympic tennis venues
Tennis venues in Belgium
Organisations based in Belgium with royal patronage
Sports venues in Antwerp Province
Belgian field hockey clubs
Field hockey clubs established in 1899